Jackson's Mill Covered Bridge may refer to:

Jacksons Mill Covered Bridge (Bedford County, Pennsylvania)
Jackson's Mill Covered Bridge (Washington County, Pennsylvania)
Jackson's Sawmill Covered Bridge, Lancaster County, Pennsylvania